The Dearcc EV10 is a city car engineered and produced by the Chinese electric car manufacturer Dearcc. It was launched in the Chinese market on November 17, 2017, and the range extended version called the Dearcc EV10 Pro300 was launched on July 7, 2018.

Overview
The Dearcc brand officially debut in November 2016 on the 2016 Guangzhou Auto Show. The Dearcc EV10 was powered by an electric motor manufactured by the Shanghai Edrive Corporation with the motor's factory designation TZ200XS03Z. The TZ200XS03Z electric motor has an output of 57 hp, and can produce enough power for the Dearcc EV10 to reach 100 km/hr top speed. Prices of the Dearcc EV10 electric city car ranges from 115,900 yuan to 123,900 yuan at launch in 2017.

Design controversies

The Dearcc EV10 electric city car is a controversial car from the styling point of view, as it heavily resembles the Opel Adam from the rear quarter. Chinese automotive manufacturers were known to reverse engineer cars from other brands which result in similar looking cars that were often refer to being a replica or copycat when it comes to styling. Despite the size difference and the fact that the Dearcc EV10 has 5 doors instead of 3, the only obvious styling difference is the front fascia.

References

External links 

 Official Dearcc EV10 website 

City cars
Hatchbacks
2010s cars
Cars introduced in 2017
Production electric cars
Cars of China